Cape Leahy is an ice-covered cape which marks the northern extremity of Duncan Peninsula, Carney Island, along the coast of Marie Byrd Land, Antarctica. It was discovered and photographed from the air on January 24, 1947, by United States Navy Operation Highjump, 1946–1947, and named by Rear admiral Richard E. Byrd for Fleet Admiral William D. Leahy, U.S. Navy, who, as naval advisor to President Harry S. Truman at the time of Operation Highjump, assisted materially at the high-level planning and authorization stages.

References

Headlands of Marie Byrd Land